Aalsum is a small hamlet in the Dutch province of Groningen. It is located in the municipality of Westerkwartier, about 1.5 km west of Oldehove. 

The hamlet was located on a wierde, an artificial dwelling hill. The hill was partially excavated in the 20th century; a bow from the ninth century was found. Plans to reconstruct the hill were canceled.

According to the 19th-century historian A.J. van der Aa, Aalsum had 80 inhabitants in the middle of the 19th century; presumably, this includes the surrounding countryside.

References

External links 
 

Populated places in Groningen (province)
Westerkwartier (municipality)
Westerkwartier